The Chanthaburi rock gecko (Cnemaspis chanthaburiensis) is a species of geckos found in Cambodia and eastern Thailand.

References

External links 

Cnemaspis
Reptiles described in 1998
Lizards of Asia